Vejle Municipality (Danish: Vejle Kommune) is a municipality (kommune) in the Region of Southern Denmark on the Jutland peninsula in southeast Denmark. January 2022). Its mayor is Arne Sigtenbjerggaard, a member of the liberal party Venstre. Vejle Municipality's offices are located in its largest population center, the city of Vejle.

In its current configuration, Vejle Municipality was formed under the Municipal Reform of 2007 (Kommunalreformen) by merging the previously existing Vejle Municipality with the neighboring municipalities of Børkop, Egtved, Give (except for properties in two parishes Lindeballe and Ringive occupied by Billund Airport, which became part of Billund Municipality), Jelling, as well as the parish of Grejs, which formerly belonged to the municipality of Tørring-Uldum.

The municipality is part of Triangle Region and of the East Jutland metropolitan area, which had a total population of 1.378 million in 2016.

The central administration of the Region of Southern Denmark is in Vejle, located in the former Vejle County offices at Damhaven 12.

Locations

Politics
Vejle's municipal council consists of 31 members, elected every four years. The municipal council has ten political committees.

Municipal council
Below are the municipal councils elected since the Municipal Reform of 2007.

Notable attractions 
Haraldskær Woman
The Jelling Monument (UNESCO World Heritage site)

Sources
 Municipal statistics: NetBorger Kommunefakta, delivered from KMD aka Kommunedata (Municipal Data)
 Municipal mergers and neighbors: Eniro  new municipalities map

References

External links 

 
Vejle municipal Atlas (In Danish)
Vejle Byhistoriske Arkiv & Stadsarkiv (City Historical Archive) (In Danish, some English)

 
Municipalities of the Region of Southern Denmark
Municipalities of Denmark
Populated places established in 2007